Decimalisation or decimalization is the conversion of a measurement system to units of decimal (base ten) form, instead of traditional units of other forms, such as those formed by successive doubling or halving. For example, a series of (1000, 100, 10, 1, 0.1, 0.01, 0.001) instead of (16, 8, 4, 2, 1). Thus the word may refer to: 
 Decimalisation of currencies
 Decimalisation of physical measurements (such as distance or weight), intimately bound historically with metrication 
 Decimalisation of time units
 Decimalisation of the time of day via decimal time systems 
 Decimalisation of the calendar via decimal calendar systems